Ceratinopsis is a genus of dwarf spiders that was first described by James Henry Emerton in 1882.

Species
 it contains forty-six species:
Ceratinopsis acripes (Denis, 1962) – Canary Is., Madeira
Ceratinopsis africana (Holm, 1962) – Gabon, Kenya
Ceratinopsis atolma Chamberlin, 1925 – USA
Ceratinopsis auriculata Emerton, 1909 – USA, Canada
Ceratinopsis benoiti (Holm, 1968) – Tanzania
Ceratinopsis bicolor Banks, 1896 – USA
Ceratinopsis blesti Locket, 1982 – Malaysia
Ceratinopsis bona Chamberlin & Ivie, 1944 – USA
Ceratinopsis crosbyi Chamberlin, 1949 – USA
Ceratinopsis delicata Chamberlin & Ivie, 1939 – USA
Ceratinopsis dippenaari Jocqué, 1984 – South Africa
Ceratinopsis disparata (Dondale, 1959) – USA
Ceratinopsis fako Bosmans & Jocqué, 1983 – Cameroon
Ceratinopsis georgiana Chamberlin & Ivie, 1944 – USA
Ceratinopsis gosibia Chamberlin, 1949 – USA
Ceratinopsis guerrerensis Gertsch & Davis, 1937 – Mexico
Ceratinopsis holmi Jocqué, 1981 – Malawi, Tanzania
Ceratinopsis idanrensis Locket & Russell-Smith, 1980 – Nigeria, Botswana
Ceratinopsis infuscata (Denis, 1962) – Madeira
Ceratinopsis interpres (O. Pickard-Cambridge, 1874) (type) – USA
Ceratinopsis interventa Chamberlin, 1949 – USA
Ceratinopsis labradorensis Emerton, 1925 – Canada
Ceratinopsis laticeps Emerton, 1882 – USA
Ceratinopsis locketi Millidge, 1995 – Indonesia (Krakatau)
Ceratinopsis machadoi (Miller, 1970) – Nigeria, Angola
Ceratinopsis mbamensis Bosmans, 1988 – Cameroon
Ceratinopsis monticola (Simon, 1894) – Sri Lanka
Ceratinopsis munda (O. Pickard-Cambridge, 1896) – Guatemala
Ceratinopsis nigriceps Emerton, 1882 – USA, Canada
Ceratinopsis nigripalpis Emerton, 1882 – USA, Canada
Ceratinopsis nitida (Holm, 1964) – Cameroon, Congo
Ceratinopsis oregonicola Chamberlin, 1949 – USA
Ceratinopsis orientalis Locket, 1982 – Laos, Malaysia (mainland), Indonesia (Java)
Ceratinopsis palomara Chamberlin, 1949 – USA
Ceratinopsis raboeli Scharff, 1989 – Kenya
Ceratinopsis rosea Banks, 1898 – Mexico
Ceratinopsis ruberrima Franganillo, 1926 – Cuba
Ceratinopsis secuta Chamberlin, 1949 – USA
Ceratinopsis setoensis (Oi, 1960) – Korea, Japan
Ceratinopsis sinuata Bosmans, 1988 – Cameroon
Ceratinopsis sutoris Bishop & Crosby, 1930 – USA, Canada
Ceratinopsis swanea Chamberlin & Ivie, 1944 – USA
Ceratinopsis sylvania Chamberlin & Ivie, 1944 – USA
Ceratinopsis watsinga Chamberlin, 1949 – USA
Ceratinopsis xanthippe (Keyserling, 1886) – USA
Ceratinopsis yola Chamberlin & Ivie, 1939 – USA

See also
 List of Linyphiidae species

References

Araneomorphae genera
Cosmopolitan spiders
Linyphiidae